The Goldenberg scandal was a political scandal where the Kenyan government was found to have subsidised exports of gold far beyond standard arrangements during the 1990s, by paying the company Goldenberg International 35% more (in Kenyan shillings) than their foreign currency earnings. Although it notionally appears that the scheme was intended to earn hard currency for the country, it is estimated to have cost Kenya the equivalent of more than 10% of the country's annual gross domestic product, and it is possible that no or minimal amounts of gold were actually exported. The scandal appears to have involved political corruption at the highest levels of the government of Daniel Arap Moi. Officials in the former government of Mwai Kibaki have also been implicated.

Background
Similar to most countries, Kenya encourages international trade by granting tax-free status to commercial enterprises involved in the export of goods and sometimes subsidises these exports. The Goldenberg scandal was based on the fact that exporters who deposited US$ earnings with the Kenya central bank received in exchange the equivalent in Kenyan shillings plus 20 percent.

However, gold mining represented a tiny portion of Kenya's GDP, with only one operational gold mine (at Kakamega). Goldenberg International therefore developed a scheme of smuggling gold into Kenya from Congo, so that they could legally export it at the higher export price offered by the Kenyan government.

Details
The chief architect behind the scheme was a relative of the Kenyan businessman Kamlesh Pattni. However, it was Pattni who established Goldenberg International to implement the scheme. Almost all the politicians in the Moi government and a considerable percentage of the Kibaki government have been accused. The judicial system also appears to have been deeply involved, with twenty-three of Kenya's senior judges resigning after evidence indicated their involvement.

The scheme began in 1991, almost immediately after the Kenya government, following directions from the IMF, introduced measures to reform the economy and increase international trade and investment, and seems to have stopped in 1993 when it was exposed by a whistleblower, David Munyakei. As a result of this, Munyakei was fired from his position at the Central Bank of Kenya, and remained largely unemployed until his death in 2006. There have been two investigations on the scam, one under the Moi government and the other under the Kibaki's government. The gold, if there was any, was likely imported from Democratic Republic of the Congo.

Bosire report
On 3 February 2006, following an investigation under the Kibaki government, a report by Justice Bosire recommended that the Education Minister at that time, George Saitoti, should face criminal charges for his actions and that former President Daniel arap Moi should be further investigated. Saitoti was both vice-president and finance minister under Moi in the early 1990s. On 13 February, Saitoti's resignation was announced by President Kibaki in a television address.

The Bosire report found that KSh.158.3 billion/= of Goldenberg money was transacted with 487 companies and individuals. A list of exhibits compiled by the commission placed Goldenberg International Ltd at the top of the primary recipients of the money, at KSh.35.3 billion/=. The directors of Goldenberg were named as Pattni and James Kanyotu. Although Kanyotu was the director of the Special Branch (intelligence unit of the Kenya Police, now known as National Intelligence Services, NIS) and a director of First American Bank, he described himself as a farmer in Goldenberg documents. President Moi was named by Pattni as having been a shareholder of GIL by nominee. However, President Moi himself was never called to present evidence despite this alleged link.

Cost
In response to a query by Joseph Lekuton, on 16 December 2008, Orwa Ojode the Assistant Minister for Provincial Administration and Internal Security confirmed to parliament that the commission had cost the Kenya Government Kshs 511,569,409.90.

Travel restrictions
Shortly after, Saitoti along with 20 several others suspected to be involved in the scandal were prohibited from leaving the country and ordered to surrender any weapons they possessed. Among those named were

 Gideon Moi, retired President Moi's son, also the Baringo Central MP
 Mr Philip Moi, retired President Moi's son
 Mr Moi's lawyer, Mr Mutula Kilonzo
 Mr Moi's former personal assistant, Mr Joshua Kulei
 Former Central Bank of Kenya governor Eric Kotut
 former Central Bank of Kenya deputy governor Eliphas Riungu
 former Central Bank of Kenya employee Job Kilach.
 former Central Bank of Kenya employee Tom Werunga
 former Central Bank of Kenya employee Michael Wanjihia
 Philip Murgor, the former director of public prosecutions
 Mr Murgor's law firm represented the Central Bank of Kenya during the two-year public inquiry headed by Mr Justice Bosire.
 Former Treasury permanent secretary Charles Mbindyo
 former Treasury permanent secretary Wilfred Karuga Koinange
 former Treasury permanent secretary Joseph Magari
 Prof George Saitoti, who resigned as Education minister.
 Goldenberg architect Kamlesh Pattni
 Pattni's business partner and former Special Branch chief James Kanyotu
 former commissioner of Mines and Geology Collins Owayo
 Mr Arthur Ndegwa, senior mining engineer in the Commissioner of Mines Nairobi office
 former commissioner of Customs and Excise Francis Cheruiyot.
 former Kenya Commercial Bank general manager Elijah arap Bii

Former president Moi himself was not listed.

The Law Society of Kenya chairman Tom Ojienda criticised Police Commissioner Hussein Ali's move to seize travel documents. He described the decisions as "a total violation of the law and the Constitution". Ojienda regretted that individuals had been charged, tried and convicted by the court of public opinion and the media or through political statements. He commended three Cabinet ministers who resigned to pave way for investigations into the Anglo Leasing and Goldenberg scandals. "The resignation of three members of Cabinet signifies the maturity of our democracy, where leaders whose reputations are besmirched would opt to resign pending investigations to clear their names rather than hold the Government hostage. Such resignations are no pointers to guilt."

Prosecution
Two transactions stand out – one for KSh.5.8 billion/= from the Central Bank to Goldenberg International in 1993, personally authorised by then-president Daniel Arap Moi, and another for KSh.13.5 billion/=. The then CID director Joseph Kamau told reporters on 9 March 2006 that files on Pattni, Kanyotu, Koinange, Kotut, Bii, Riungu and Werunga had been passed to attorney-general Amos Wako. Wako has been attorney-general since 1991, when Moi was in power.

Wako is recommending that the country's chief justice consider overturning a previous court order exempting Mr Saitoti from prosecution. All except Werunga are to be charged. The prosecution hopes that Werunga will be their witness.

In August 2006, it was reported that a constitutional court had ruled that Saitoti could not be charged. The Kenyan media reacted negatively to the decision. The Kenya Times saw political motives behind it, while The Daily Nation editorialised that the "War on graft is, indeed, lost".

See also
 Corruption in Kenya
 Anglo Leasing Scandal
 Nicholas Biwott
 John Githongo

References

External links 
 BBC
 A short story on Goldenberg
  USA government study of Kenya's mineral industry(pdf)
 Document attempt by government to place blame on a Canadian
 Forensic accountants traces goldenburg transaction
 This article may explain Goldenburg in a different style
 CNN report on deportation of Canadian
 Involvement of judges in Goldenburg scandal
 Graft evidence stuns Kenyan MPs

Scandals in Kenya
Corruption in Kenya
1990s in Kenya
Political scandals in Kenya